Bouadikro is a village in eastern Ivory Coast. It is two kilometres north of Abengourou, in the sub-prefecture of Abengourou, Abengourou Department, Indénié-Djuablin Region, Comoé District.

Bouadikro was a commune until March 2012, when it became one of 1126 communes nationwide that were abolished.

Notes

Former communes of Ivory Coast
Populated places in Comoé District
Populated places in Indénié-Djuablin